DragonflyTV is an Emmy-award winning science education television series produced by Twin Cities Public Television. The show aired on PBS Kids and PBS Kids Go! from January 19, 2002 to December 20, 2008. It was aimed at ages 9–12. Seasons 1–4 were co-hosted by Michael Brandon Battle and Mariko Nakasone. Seasons 5–7 were hosted by Eric Artell and were produced in partnership with science museums. DragonflyTV was created in collaboration with Project Dragonfly at Miami University, which founded Dragonfly magazine, the first national magazine to feature children's investigations, experiments, and discoveries. DragonflyTV pioneered a "real kids, real science" approach to children's science television and led to the development of the SciGirls television series. DragonflyTV and SciGirls were funded in part by the National Science Foundation to provide a national forum for children's scientific investigations. Reruns of DragonflyTV aired on select PBS stations until 2010, and later in off-network syndication to allow commercial stations to meet federal E/I mandates.

Episodes

Season 1 (2002)

Season 2 (2003)
Teams of DFTV's kid scientists demonstrate different approaches to investigations – experimental, engineering, and observational.

Season 3 (2004)

Season 4 (2005)

Season 5 (2006)

Season 6 (2007)

Season 7 (2008)

References

External links 
 
 
  Twin Cities Public Television

2002 American television series debuts
2008 American television series endings
2000s American children's television series
2000s American reality television series
American children's education television series
American children's reality television series
English-language television shows
PBS Kids shows
PBS original programming
Mathematics education television series
Science education television series
Television series about children